The 	Chukyo Kinen (Japanese 中京記念) is a Grade 3 horse race for Thoroughbreds aged three and over, run in July over a distance of 1600 metres on turf at Chukyo Racecourse.

It was first run in 1953 and has held Grade 3 status since 1984. The race was usually run over 1800 metres before being reduced to its current distance in 2012. It was run at Kokura Racecourse in 1991, 1993, 1994 and 2011.

Winners since 2000

Earlier winners

 1984 - Hashi Rody
 1985 - Power Cedar
 1986 - Shining Ruby
 1987 - Tosho Leo
 1988 - Topcoat
 1989 - Inter Animato
 1990 - Osaichi George
 1991 - Lets Go Tarquin
 1992 - Movie Star
 1993 - Arashi
 1994 - Shimano Yamahime
 1995 - Chokai Carol
 1996 - Inazuma Takao
 1997 - Aloha Dream
 1998 - Toyo Rainbow
 1999 - Erimo Excel

See also
 Horse racing in Japan
 List of Japanese flat horse races

References

Turf races in Japan